Dragi Kocev (born 25 February 1987 in Radoviš, SFR Yugoslavia) is a Macedonian footballer who plays as an attacking midfielder.

In June 2005, he received a Bulgarian passport. In 2005 and 2006 Kocev was a member of the Macedonian national under-19 football team.

Club career
Born in Radoviš, Kocev start to play football in local club FK Jaka. When he was only 14 years old he went to Blagoevgrad, together with his compatriot Zoran Zlatkovski, and their first club in Bulgaria was Pirin Blagoevgrad, where they progressed through the youth ranks before becoming part of the senior side. Kocev made his A PFG debut in 2004. During the season 2007/08 Kocev was loaned to Pirin Gotse Delchev and played one year in Bulgarian second division.

Lokomotiv Plovdiv
Kocev signed with Lokomotiv Plovdiv on 26 July 2010 on a two-year deal. He made his debut on 31 July in a 1–1 away draw against Vidima-Rakovski. Kocev scored his first A PFG goal for Lokomotiv in a 3–0 win against Akademik Sofia on 6 November.

References

External links
 Profile at MacedonianFootball.com 
 Profile at metro.mobi.com 

1987 births
Living people
People from Radoviš
Association football midfielders
Macedonian footballers
North Macedonia youth international footballers
OFC Pirin Blagoevgrad players
PFC Pirin Blagoevgrad players
PFC Pirin Gotse Delchev players
PFC Lokomotiv Plovdiv players
First Professional Football League (Bulgaria) players
Second Professional Football League (Bulgaria) players
Macedonian expatriate footballers
Expatriate footballers in Bulgaria
Macedonian expatriate sportspeople in Bulgaria